The 2012–13 Torquay United F.C. season was Torquay United's 77th season in the Football League and their fourth consecutive season in League Two. The season ran from 1 July 2012 to 30 June 2013.

First team squad

End of season honours
At the end of the 2012–13 season four awards were given out, for Young Player of the Season, Top Goalscorer, Players' Player of the Season and Supporters' Player of the Season.

 Young Player of the Season - Daniel Sullivan
 Top Goalscorer - Rene Howe
 Players' Player of the Season - Brian Saah
 Supporters' Player of the Season - Aaron Downes

League Two

League table

Results summary

Results by round

Results

League Two

FA Cup

League Cup

League Trophy

Friendlies

Devon St Luke's Bowl

Club statistics

First team appearances

|-
|}
Source: Torquay United

Top scorers

Source: Torquay United

Disciplinary record

Source: Torquay United

Transfers

In

Loans in

Out

Loans out

References

2012–13 Football League Two by team
2012-13